Jovana Rad (Serbian Cyrillic: Јована Рад; born May 8, 1987) is a Serbian professional basketball player. She plays as a power forward for the Serbian club Crvena zvezda.

Jovana is a member of the Serbia national basketball team.

External links
Profile at FIBA Europe

1987 births
Living people
Serbian women's basketball players
Basketball players from Novi Sad
Power forwards (basketball)
ŽKK Spartak Subotica players
Serbian expatriate basketball people in France
Serbian expatriate basketball people in Spain